The List of shipwrecks in 1747 includes some ships sunk, wrecked or otherwise lost during 1747.

April
1747 did not begin on 1 January!

Unknown date

May

Unknown date

June

21 June

26 June

Unknown date

July

5 July

Unknown date

August

Unknown date

September

15 September

21 September

October

8 October

24 October

25 October

28 October

Unknown date

November

19 November

20 November

29 November

Unknown date

December

1 December

Unknown date

January

25 January

Unknown date

February

20 February

23 February

Unknown date

March

Unknown date

Unknown date

Notes
 Until 1752, the year began on Lady Day (25 March) Thus 24 March 1746 was followed by 25 March 1747. 31 December 1747 was followed by 1 January 1747.

References

1747